Roselina Tirkey (born 1 May 1982) is an Indian politician. She was elected to the Assam Legislative Assembly from Sarupathar as a member of the Indian National Congress.

References

Indian National Congress politicians
Members of the Assam Legislative Assembly
Living people
1982 births